Ličko Polje is a polje (karstic field) in the Lika region, located in Croatia. Being the largest in Croatia, the field covers an area of 465 km2, and consists of five smaller fields: Lipovo, Kosinjsko, Pazariško, Brezovo and Gospićko.

The field is characterized by some inselbergs, among them Zir (852 m), Otež (745 m) and Debeljak (882 m). The population is engaged in crops and farming. Largest settlement is Gospić.

References

Plains of Croatia
Geology of Croatia